Daniel Joseph Murphy (September 10, 1864 – December 14, 1915) was a professional baseball catcher. He played part of one season in Major League Baseball for the New York Giants of the National League in 1892. In eight games with the Giants, he had a .115 batting average.

Sources

Major League Baseball catchers
New York Giants (NL) players
Lawrence/Salem (minor league baseball) players
Houston Babies players
Houston Red Stockings players
New Orleans Pelicans (baseball) players
Sioux City Corn Huskers players
Jersey City Jerseys players
Newark Little Giants players
Providence Clamdiggers (baseball) players
Troy Trojans (minor league) players
Troy Washerwomen players
Scranton Indians players
Baseball players from New York (state)
19th-century baseball players
1864 births
1915 deaths
Burials at Holy Cross Cemetery, Brooklyn